A skirret is an archaic form of chalk line. It is a wooden tool shaped like the letter "T", historically used to ensure the  foundation of a building was straight by laying down string as a marker. Today it is obsolete and little known, save for its use in some Freemasonry ceremonies.

Shaped like the letter "T" — with two horizontal pieces of wood at the top and about halfway down the vertical stake. The horizontal two cross-pieces are connected by a dowel at each end, around which a long length of string is wound.

To use, the  craftsman unwound the string from its  spindle and utilised it to lay out the dimensions of the structure being built, acting on a centre pin from which a line was drawn out to mark the ground. In certain instances, with the spindle as the centre, the skirret could also have been used for drawing a circle.

References

Surveying instruments
Orientation (geometry)
Carpentry tools
Freemasonry

In some Grand Lodges' adopted forms of the Ritual, which vary from one Grand Lodge to another, the Skirret is one of the 'Working Tools' presented to a Master Mason. This is not one of the universally recognized 'Working Tools', used in the Ritual of all Grand Lodges.